Preston Castle, or Tulketh Castle, was a motte and bailey castle in the Ashton-on-Ribble district of Preston, Lancashire, England.

The site became disused at an early stage but the mound was not leveled until 1855.

References

Buildings and structures in Preston
History of Preston